The Simplex Automobile Company was formed in 1907 to take over the manufacturer of the S & M Simplex.  The Simplex was an American luxury Brass Era automobile manufactured from 1907 to 1918.  Headquartered with a manufacturing plant in New York City, manufacturing from 1912 was in New Brunswick, New Jersey.  The Simplex Crane Model 5 was commonly called Simplex-Crane and Crane-Simplex.  The Crane-Simplex Company of Long Island, New York was an attempt in 1922 to revive the brand but closed after only a few chassis were built.

History 
The Smith & Mabley Manufacturing Company of New York City was established by Smith & Mabley, Inc. to manufacturer automobiles in 1904. The S & M Simplex was a luxury car designed by Chief Engineer Gustav Edward Franquist who was influenced by European designs.  With an impending bankruptcy, Smith & Mabley, Inc. sold their automobile manufacturing company and plant to their friend Herman Broesel, Sr. in March 1907.  Broesel established the Simplex Automobile Company, capital of $2,000, to take over from Smith & Mabley Manufacturing Company and set up a salesroom at 12 West 23rd street.

New York City 
Textile importer Herman Broesel, Sr., brought on board his sons Herman Broesel, Jr. and Carl Broesel who shared a passion for automobile and motor boat racing. Wilbur C. Whitehead was appointed President.  Edward Franquist's services were retained.

In January 1908 it was announced that Palmer & Singer would be the sole selling agents for Simplex Automobiles, and C. M. Hamilton, former Simplex salesman, would be joining the firm. The Sales room was located in Palmer & Singers new building at 1620 Broadway.  J. M Quinby & Company continued to be the main coachbuilder for Simplex.  Palmer & Singer introduced their own line of cars with the separate Simplex Model 50 offered at $5,750, being the leader of their line.

For 1909 the Simplex 50hp model remained the main offering.  A new, more powerful Simplex was the G. E. Franquist designed 90hp model, that could reach speeds of 90mph.  In 1909 American-La France of Elmira, contracted for Simplex 50-hp chassis and engines for their firefighting equipment.

By 1910 Simplex sales office was located at 1860 Broadway, New York City and the factory continued to be located at 614 East 83rd Street.  Wilbur C. Whitehead retired from the presidency of Simplex Automobile in 1910 to devote his energies to contract bridge.

Motor Boats 
Simplex engines powered the Dixie series motor boats which won the Harmsworth Cup four times between 1907 and 1911. Clinton H. Crane was the designer of the Dixie and Simplex series of motor boats. His brother Henry M. Crane was involved with Edward Franquist in engine design.  Franquist built motor boat engines up to 8-cylinders but Henry Crane did as well.

Motorsport 

Simplex actively competed in races and hill-climbs usually with top results.  Simplex won the 24 Hour Race at Brighton Beach in 1908 with drivers George Robertson and Frank Lescault.  In July 1909, Simplex again won the Brighton Beach 24 Hour race with drivers George Robertson and Al Poole.  George Robertson won the Fairmount Park race in Philadelphia in 1909 with his 90 h.p. Simplex.

In May 1910 Simplex won the Brighton Beach 24 Hour race for a third time with drivers Al Poole and Charles Basle.  At the 1911 Brighton Beach meet, Simplex driver Leonard Ormsby was disqualified after causing a fatal crash.  H. Frey in his Mercer died while avoiding Ormsby during an illegal turn in a practice run.  Ralph DePalma replaced Ormsby and Simplex placed third in the race.  In 1911, Competing in a Simplex 50hp model, Ralph DePalma with his mechanic Charles Bury ran the first Indianapolis 500 race placing Sixth.

By November 1911, Simplex was again running their own sales rooms.  Simplex reported it was spending $50,000 annually on their racing program and as an advertising cost had an insufficient return from the 'sporty" class of buyers it attracted.  Racing would be curtailed with plans to broaden Simplex's print advertising.  Simplex stated that maximum output was limited to about 350 cars a year.

New Jersey and New York 

Simplex established a new plant in New Brunswick, New Jersey  and moved in on November 15, 1911.  With the closing of the New York City factory, a large service department in Long Island City at Vernon Avenue and 12th Street was established.  Simplex sales office was now at 59th Street and Central Park, South.

On June 5, 1912 Herman Broesel died and in September 1913 his sons sold the company to Bankers Goodrich, Lockhart and Smith of New York, NY.  Henry Lockhart, Jr. became president.  John D. Dale, Sales Manager and G. E . Franquist, Factory Superintendent, remained as directors.   Herman A. Broesel, Jr. became the manager of the Long Island City Service Department and Carl A. Broesel joined Franquist in New Brunswick.  The Simplex Automobile Capital was increased from $1,000,000 to $1,500,000.

Simplex, Crane Model 5 

The Crane Motor Company of Bayonne, New Jersey, built automobiles from 1912 to 1915.  The Crane Model 3 was a six-cylinder car offered only as a chassis.  The chassis was priced at $8,000, the highest priced American chassis on the market.  Crane favored Brewster & Co. as a coachbuilder and most Crane automobiles were bodied by that firm.  Only about 20 Crane Model 3s were made in 1912 and 1913.  By 1914 a Model 4 was produced by Crane.  It differed in having the six cylinders cast in two blocks of three instead of three pairs.

This new six cylinder design attracted the attention of the Simplex Automobile Company.  The Simplex needed a more refined design than the large chain-drive four-cylinder automobiles it was producing.  In July 1915, the Simplex Automobile Company purchased the Crane Motor Company, acquiring at the same time the services of Henry Middlebrook Crane.  Henry M. Crane became second vice-president and Chief Engineer.  Edward Franquist departed Simplex and in 1918 would become Chief Engineer for James Cunningham, Son and Company for the Cunningham automobile.

The Crane Model 4, became the Simplex, Crane Model 5.  From the beginning of the announcement of the Simplex purchase of Crane, The Automobile magazine referred to the new car as Crane-Simplex, only mentioning later in the September 1915 article that it was the Crane model of Simplex  The article describes the new six cylinder shaft driven car with 100-hp at 2000-rpm.  In the August 1916 Automobile Topics magazine 2- page article, the new cars was described as the "Model 5 Simplex-Crane -- or plain Simplex".  Although never official, the Simplex Crane Model 5 would often be referred to as the Crane-Simplex.

Bodies were built by a variety of coachbuilders including Brewster, Healey, Holbrook, Stone and Demarest in addition to their own Simplex bodies.  The chassis was guaranteed for life in the hands of the original owner.

Wright-Martin and World War I 

In October 1915, the Wright Company of Garwood, New Jersey entered into an agreement to purchase the Simplex Automobile Company.  In November Henry Lockhart, Jr. became President of  Wright.  In August of 1916 Wright Company merged with the Glenn L. Martin Company and the new Wright-Martin Aircraft Corporation would purchase all outstanding Simplex Automobile Company stock to make it a wholly owned subsidiary.  Henry Lockhart, Jr. and Henry M. Crane would continue as Directors with Wright-Martin.

The Simplex plant would begin construction of aviation motors for Wright-Martin.  Morris Metcalf was appointed vice-president in charge of the Simplex departments of sales, body, service and publicity.  The Simplex Automobile Company plant was enlarged to begin production off the Hispano-Suiza airplane engine under license.

Simplex Automobile production at New Brunswick ceased in October 1917, as Wright-Martin concentrated Simplex production on airplane engines for World War I.

Slow Demise 
In January 1920, the Mercer Motor Company of Trenton, NJ  under the control of Emlen S. Hare, would absorb the assets of the Simplex Automobile Company.  Automobile equipment was relocated to the Vernon Avenue building in Queens which had been used as a service department.  In February 1920 Hare's Motors, Incorporated was organized to take over the assets of Locomobile, Mercer and Simplex.  Kelly-Springfield Motor Truck Company was added in November 1920.

In July 1921 Hare's motors announced it would be dissolved and the separate units would reorganize as individual companies. Simplex which was still not producing cars, reverted to Mercer ownership.  By July 1922, a reorganization of Mercer Motors and reversal of its arrangements with Hare Motors was finally completed.  In November of 1922, Henry M. Crane announced the Crane-Simplex Company with the Queens, New York plant and assets being purchased from Mercer.  Plans for 100 cars per year production were spelled out, but it appears production never resumed.  Henry M. Crane became a consulting engineer to Alfred P. Sloan of General Motors.

Advertisements

Models 
From 1911, the Simplex Automobile Company concentrated on the sale of chassis over completed cars, working with the best known automobile coachbuilders of the era to provide the bodies.

Production 
A total of 1,865 vehicles were built. This includes 467 vehicles designed by Henry Crane.

External links 

 Simplex Automobiles at ConceptCarz
 1912 Crane Model 3 at ConceptCarz
 The Atlantic, October 1950 article - The Simplex by Smith Hempstone Oliver
 The Vanderbilt 1918 Crane-Simplex Model 5 at NPS.gov
 Simplex Automobile Company at DPL Digital Collections
 Jay Leno and the 1916 Simplex Crane Model 5 Holbrook Skiff at ClassicCarsJournal
 After 100 years, J.D. Rockefeller’s 1917 Crane-Simplex takes a ‘Drive Home’ at ClassicCarsJournal
 Seal Cove Auto Museum - Large, Impressive and Very Rare - The 1917 Simplex-Crane
 Simplex The Best -1916 Simplex Crane Model 5 article Hemmings.com
 The 2013 Pebble Beach Concours d’Elegance – Simplex Automobile Images by Steve Natale - OldMotor.com
 1916 Simplex Crane Model 5 at 2007 Gooding Auction
 1916 Simplex Crane Model 5 Brewster at 2018 Bonhams Auction

References 

Defunct motor vehicle manufacturers of the United States
Vehicle manufacturing companies established in 1907
Vehicle manufacturing companies disestablished in 1922
Motor vehicle manufacturers based in New York (state)
Motor vehicle manufacturers based in New Jersey
Brass Era vehicles
Vintage vehicles
Luxury vehicles
Luxury motor vehicle manufacturers
1900s cars
1910s cars
Cars introduced in 1907
Companies based in New Brunswick, New Jersey